The Etzel is a mountain on the south side of Lake Zürich in Switzerland. It is also well known for its views over the lake, and there is a mountain inn at the summit.

The mountain forms part of the Schwyzer Alps mountain range, and lies in the canton of Schwyz. Its summit and slopes are divided between the municipalities of Feusisberg, which lies to the north, and Einsiedeln, which lies to the south.

The mountain has given its name to the 1934-built MV Etzel, now preserved on Lake Zürich.

References

External links

Etzel on Hikr

Mountains of Switzerland
Mountains of the canton of Schwyz